Sorygaza is a genus of moths of the family Erebidae. The genus was erected by Francis Walker in 1866.

Species
Sorygaza arbela H. Druce, 1891 Panama
Sorygaza argandina H. Druce, 1891 Panama
Sorygaza armasata H. Druce, 1891 Panama
Sorygaza didymata Walker, [1866] Venezuela, Panama
Sorygaza mardia H. Druce, 1891 Panama
Sorygaza ramsdeni Schaus, 1916 Cuba
Sorygaza variata Hayes, 1975 Galápagos Islands

References

Herminiinae